Flight 3701 may refer to:

 Cameroon Airlines Flight 3701, crashed after losing control of the aircraft on December 3, 1995
 Pinnacle Airlines Flight 3701, crashed after a dual-engine flame-out on October 14, 2004

3701